The Seidelmann 25 is an American trailerable sailboat that was designed by Bob Seidelmann as a racer-cruiser and first built in 1977.

Production
The design was built by Seidelmann Yachts in Berlin, New Jersey, United States, starting in 1977, but it is now out of production.

Design
The Seidelmann 25 is a recreational keelboat, built predominantly of fiberglass, with wood trim. It has a masthead sloop rig, a raked stem, a reverse transom, an internally mounted spade-type rudder controlled by a tiller and a fixed fin keel or optional shoal draft keel. It displaces  and carries  of ballast.

The boat is normally fitted with a small  outboard motor for docking and maneuvering.

The design has sleeping accommodation for four people, with a double "V"-berth in the bow cabin and two straight settee berths in the main cabin. The galley is located on the starboard side just forward of the companionway ladder. The galley is equipped with a two-burner stove and a sink. The portable-type head is located just aft of the bow cabin on the port side.

Operational history
The boat was at one time supported by a class club, the Seidelmann Owners.

In a 2010 review Steve Henkel wrote, "best features: The S25's wide beam gives good space down below (though not as much as her comp[etitor]s). Worst features: Some owners complain about poor construction. With its relatively narrow waterline and soft bilges, the boat is tender in heavy air unless there is plenty of 'rail meat' on board."

See also
List of sailing boat types

References

Keelboats
1970s sailboat type designs
Sailing yachts 
Trailer sailers
Sailboat type designs by Bob Seidelmann
Sailboat types built by Seidelmann Yachts